Shino VanHoose (born 3 June 1995) is an American mixed martial artist, currently competing in the Atomweight division. She previously competed in Invicta Fighting Championships.

Mixed martial arts career

Asian circuit
VanHoose made her professional debut against Nana Ichikawa at Pancrase - Impressive Tour 10 on October 2, 2011. She won by a first-round ezekiel choke submission.

VanHoose was scheduled to face Asami Higa at Jewels: 17th Ring on December 17, 2011. She won the fight by unanimous decision.

VanHoose was scheduled to face Kimie Okada at Pancrase - Progress Tour 3 on March 11, 2012. She won the fight by a first-round submission.

VanHoose was scheduled to face Kikuyo Ishikawa at Pancrase - Progress Tour 6 on May 20, 2012. She lost the fight by unanimous decision.

VanHoose was scheduled to face Sadae Numata at Pancrase - Progress Tour 12: All Eyes on Yuki Kondo on November 10, 2012. She lost the fight by a second-round submission.

VanHoose was scheduled to face the pound for pound great Seo Hee Ham at Road FC Korea 003: Korea vs. Brazil on April 6, 2014. Ham won the fight by unanimous decision.

Return to the US
VanHoose was scheduled to face Jody-Lynn Reicher at ICF 22 - Tough Enough to Fight in Pink on October 16, 2015. She won the fight by a first-round submission.

VanHoose was scheduled to make her Invicta FC debut against Amber Brown at Invicta FC 15: Cyborg vs. Ibragimova on January 16, 2016. Brown won the fight by a first-round guillotine choke.

VanHoose was scheduled to face Jenny Silverio at RFC 36 - Resurrection on February 26, 2016. Silverio won by split decision.

VanHoose was scheduled to face Sarah Lagerstrom at Front Street Fights 10 on December 9, 2016. She won the fight by a second-round technical knockout.

Invicta FC
VanHoose was scheduled to face Alyse Anderson at Invicta FC 25: Kunitskaya vs. Pa'aluhi on August 31, 2017. She won the fight by split decision.

VanHoose was scheduled to face Lindsey VanZandt at Invicta FC 37: Gonzalez vs. Sanchez on October 4, 2019, following a two-year absence from the sport. VanZandt won the fight by a first-round technical knockout.

Mixed martial arts record 

|-
|Loss
|align=center|6–6
|Lindsey VanZandt
|TKO (Leg Kick)
|Invicta FC 37: Gonzalez vs. Sanchez
|
|align=center| 1
|align=center| 0:39
|Kansas City, Kansas, United States
|
|-
|Win
|align=center|6–5
|Alyse Anderson
|Decision (Split)
|Invicta FC 25: Kunitskaya vs. Pa'aluhi
|
|align=center| 3
|align=center| 5:00
|Lemoore, California, United States
|
|-
|Win
|align=center|5–5
|Sarah Lagerstrom
|TKO (Punches)
|Front Street Fights 10
|
|align=center| 2
|align=center| 1:36
|Boise, Idaho, United States
|
|-
|Loss
|align=center|4–5
|Jenny Silverio
|Decision (Split)
|RFC 36 - Resurrection
|
|align=center| 3
|align=center| 5:00
|Tampa, Florida, United States
|
|-
|Loss
|align=center|4-4
|Amber Brown
|Submission (Guillotine Choke)
|Invicta FC 15: Cyborg vs. Ibragimova
|
|align=center| 1
|align=center| 2:36
|Costa Mesa, California, United States
|
|-
|Win
|align=center|4-3
|Jody Lynn Reicher
|Submission (Armbar)
|ICF 22 - Tough Enough to Fight in Pink
|
|align=center| 1
|align=center| 1:53
|Great Falls, Montana, United States
|
|-
|Loss
|align=center|3–3
|Seo Hee Ham
|Decision (Unanimous)
|Road FC Korea 003: Korea vs. Brazil
|
|align=center| 2
|align=center| 5:00
|Seoul, South Korea
|
|-
|Loss
|align=center|3–2
|Sadae Numata
|Submission (Kneebar)
|Pancrase - Progress Tour 12: All Eyes on Yuki Kondo
|
|align=center| 2
|align=center| 2:18
|Tokyo, Japan
|
|-
|Loss
|align=center|3–1
|Kikuyo Ishikawa
|Decision (Unanimous)
|Pancrase - Progress Tour 6
|
|align=center| 2
|align=center| 5:00
|Tokyo, Japan
|
|-
|Win
|align=center|3–0
|Kimie Okada
|Technical Submission (Armbar)
|Pancrase - Progress Tour 3
|
|align=center| 1
|align=center| 2:40
|Tokyo, Japan
|
|-
|Win
|align=center|2–0
|Asami Higa
|Decision (Unanimous)
|Jewels - 17th Ring
|
|align=center| 2
|align=center| 5:00
|Tokyo, Japan
|
|-
|Win
|align=center|1–0
|Nana Ichikawa
|Technical Submission (Ezekiel Choke)
|Pancrase - Impressive Tour 10
|
|align=center| 1
|align=center| 0:51
|Tokyo, Japan
|
|-

See also
 List of female mixed martial artists
 List of current Invicta FC fighters

References

External links
 
 Shino VanHoose at Invicta FC

1995 births
Living people
American female mixed martial artists
Atomweight mixed martial artists
Strawweight mixed martial artists
Mixed martial artists utilizing Muay Thai
Mixed martial artists utilizing Brazilian jiu-jitsu
American Muay Thai practitioners
Female Muay Thai practitioners
American practitioners of Brazilian jiu-jitsu
Female Brazilian jiu-jitsu practitioners
21st-century American women